Dr Tony Clarkson  (13 August 1939 – 25 January 2011) was an Australian rules footballer who played with Sturt in the South Australian National Football League (SANFL).

Following his football career, Clarkson became a highly regarded name in medicine as a founding director of the Renal Unit at the Royal Adelaide Hospital and president of the Medical Board of South Australia.  In The Queen's Birthday 2004 Honours List, he was awarded Member of the Order of Australia "For service to renal medicine, particularly as a contributor to the advancement of the specialty of nephrology in the Asia-Pacific region through clinical research, teaching and professional organisations, and to the community."

Notes

External links 
Tony Clarkson's profile at AustralianFootball.com

1939 births
2011 deaths
Sturt Football Club players
Australian rules footballers from South Australia
Members of the Order of Australia
University of Adelaide alumni
20th-century surgeons
Australian nephrologists
21st-century Australian medical doctors